Butyriboletus yicibus is a pored mushroom  in the genus Butyriboletus. Found Yunnan, China, where it grows in association with Yunnan pine, it was described as a new species in 2014.

References

External links

yicibus
Fungi described in 2014
Fungi of Asia